Hailstorm over Truk Lagoon is a book by Klaus Lindemann about the shipwrecks of Truk lagoon.

The wrecks were caused by Operation Hailstone, a US Navy aerial attack on the Japanese-held islands of the lagoon on 17 and 18 February 1944. American naval forces neutralized the lagoon's offensive capacity but did not try to capture it; instead they leapfrogged the islands and captured the Mariana Islands, which were within bomber range of Japan.

History books about World War II
History books about the Federated States of Micronesia
South Seas Mandate in World War II